The Ethel Proudlock case refers a 1911 shooting by Proudlock, her trial for murder,  and the cause célèbre scandalising British colonial society in Kuala Lumpur, FMS (now Malaysia) it created.

William Somerset Maugham wrote a short story about the case which he subsequently turned into a successful 1927 play, The Letter, which in turn received several film and TV adaptions, most notably William Wyler's 1940 movie The Letter.

History

The incident
Ethel Proudlock, née Charter, was a Eurasian who married William Proudlock, acting headmaster of the prestigious Victoria Institution for boys in Kuala Lumpur, at the age of 19 in 1907.

On the evening of 23 April 1911, she was alone in the VI headmaster's bungalow (near the present-day Pasar Seni LRT/MRT station) while her husband dined with a fellow teacher. In the course of that evening she shot dead William Steward, a mine manager. He had arrived by rickshaw, and had told the rickshaw boy to wait outside. Shortly afterwards the boy heard two shots and saw Steward stumble out of the house across the veranda, followed by Proudlock carrying a revolver, who emptied the remaining four chambers into him.

Proudlock stood trial for murder in June 1911. Her non-jury trial was heard by a judge and two assessors. It lasted 10 days and attracted intense local interest. Proudlock claimed that Steward had attempted to rape her and that she was acting in self-defence. However, the judge found her guilty of murder on the basis of inconsistencies in her testimony and other circumstantial evidence and sentenced her to death.

The verdict caused a furore in the local community, prompting The Malay Mail to issue a notice  reading:

Aftermath
Proudlock appealed the verdict and spent five months in Pudu jail awaiting her appeal. During the course of that time a number of petitions were created for her, including one from her husband and the boys of the Victoria Institution, prompting the Sultan of Selangor to pardon her. She immediately left the colony with her three-year-old daughter for England and eventually America.

Her husband left soon after for England. It's not known whether he ever rejoined her, but he did keep in touch. By 1931, he had moved to South Africa and ultimately to Argentina to teach at St. George's College, Quilmes. He died in 1958.

Legacy
In addition to the 1927 Maugham play and 1940 Wyler movie, the incident was referenced in the 1977 film East of Elephant Rock by Don Boyd.

It was also the subject of a 2000 book by Eric Lawlor.

See also
 Lord Erroll murder case. A 1941 murder case amongst the Happy Valley set that similarly scandalised British colonial society in Kenya.

References

External links

Trials in Malaysia
People convicted of murder by Malaysia
1911 in case law
1911 in British Malaya
20th century in Kuala Lumpur
April 1911 events